Leptolaena masoalensis is a species of flowering plant in the Sarcolaenaceae family. It is found only in Madagascar. Its natural habitat is subtropical or tropical moist lowland forests. It is threatened by habitat loss.

References

masoalensis
Endemic flora of Madagascar
Critically endangered plants
Taxonomy articles created by Polbot
Flora of the Madagascar lowland forests